Robert Žulj (born 5 February 1992) is an Austrian professional footballer who plays as a midfielder or forward for LASK.

Career

Greuther Fürth
In July 2014, Žulj joined Greuther Fürth from Red Bull Salzburg.

Žulj finished the 2016–16 season, scoring 8 goals and contributing 9 assists in 32 league matches. In June 2017, he announced he had decided not to renew his contract at Greuther Fürth. In his time at the club, he made a total of 85 appearances in the 2. Bundesliga, scoring 19 goals and contributing 14 assists.

1899 Hoffenheim
Days after announcing his decision to leave Greuther Fürth, Žulj signed a three-year contract with TSG 1899 Hoffenheim.

Loan to Union Berlin
In August 2018, he joined 1. FC Union Berlin on loan for the 2018–19 season.

VfL Bochum
On 15 January 2020, VfL Bochum announced the capture of Žulj on a three-year deal.

Personal life
Žulj was born in Austria and is of Burgenland Croatian descent. He is the older brother of Peter Žulj, who is also a professional footballer.

Career statistics

Honours
Red Bull Salzburg
 Austrian Bundesliga: 2013–14
 Austrian Cup: 2013–14
VfL Bochum
 2. Bundesliga: 2020–21

References

External links
 

1992 births
Living people
Association football forwards
Austrian footballers
Austria youth international footballers
Austria under-21 international footballers
Austrian people of Croatian descent
Burgenland Croats
Austrian Football Bundesliga players
2. Bundesliga players
Bundesliga players
UAE Pro League players
SV Ried players
FC Red Bull Salzburg players
SpVgg Greuther Fürth players
TSG 1899 Hoffenheim players
TSG 1899 Hoffenheim II players
1. FC Union Berlin players
VfL Bochum players
Al-Ittihad Kalba SC players
LASK players
Austrian expatriate footballers
Expatriate footballers in Germany
Expatriate footballers in the United Arab Emirates
Austrian expatriate sportspeople in Germany
People from Wels
Footballers from Upper Austria